Trifolium pignantii is a species of clover in the pea family Fabaceae, native to Albania, Bulgaria, the former Yugoslavia, and Greece.

References 
 GBIF entry
 
 J. B. G. M. Bory de Saint-Vincent et al., Exp. sci. Morée, Bot. 3(2):219. 1832.
 Gillett, J. M. & N. L. Taylor (M. Collins ed.). 2001. The world of clovers.
 Tutin, T. G. et al., eds. 1964–1980. Flora europaea.
 Zohary, M. & D. Heller. 1984. The genus Trifolium.

pignantii
Taxa named by Louis Athanase Chaubard